Sunesson is a surname. Notable people with the surname include:

Botvid Sunesson (died 1562), Swedish prelate
Fanny Sunesson (born 1967), professional golf caddie
Magnus Sunesson (born 1964), Swedish golfer
Thomas Sunesson (1959–2015), Swedish footballer

See also
Suneson